The KV100 A (A7-A13) series and B (B1-B14) series were street legal 99.7cc Kawasaki motorcycles made from 1976 through 1988.

Designed mainly for the agricultural market, the KV100 was a dirt/trail or dirt-road motorcycle powered by a single cylinder, two stroke, rotary disc valve engine with displacement of 99.7cc producing 11.5hp at 7500 rpm. Turn signals/indicators were optional along with special guards for the headlight, handlebars, engine and chain. It had a pack rack and an optional holder for a long-handled shovel. The KV100 A7 produced in 1976 had a red fuel tank and chrome fenders front and back. They were available in various colors (yellow, white, blue, green) indicating around changes in petrol tank and guards until Kawasaki adopted its well-known green color branding for its trail bikes around 1989.  Plastic mudguards were used around 1982.

The KV100 series is known for being made up of parts from G3, G4, and G5 models of the same era which used the same frame or engine.  They were sold in Australia, New Zealand and Canada.  In Australia and New Zealand they were marketed by stock agents direct to farmers as well as being available through local distributor and retail networks. The KV100 series has also been seen in Thailand and some countries in Africa, such asZimbabwe.

Some models had a Hi/Low 10 Gear system which enabled the motorcycle to travel at a walking pace, or at speed. Low was used by farmers for mustering cattle, and riders wanting to travel up steep inclines or through other terrain needing high revs and constant speed. Tires were usually dual purpose with 3.00 x 18 rims front and back though full 'knobby' tyres were available on later models.

Photos

1982 publicity photo
https://commons.wikimedia.org/wiki/File:!BnR12B!Bmk%7E$(KGrHqQOKiIEtlNUmFi!BLi1DG)kT!%7E%7E_12.JPG
barn find
https://commons.wikimedia.org/wiki/File:KV100_(year_unknown).JPG
restored barn find
https://commons.wikimedia.org/wiki/File:KV100_(model_not_known.JPG

References

KV100